Congress Theatre may refer to:

Congress Theatre (Torfaen)
Congress Theatre (Eastbourne)
Congress Theater, Chicago